Princess Suvabaktra Vilayabanna or Phra Chao Boromwongse Ther Phra Ong Chao Suvabaktra Vilayabanna (RTGS: Suwaphak Wilaiphan) (2 May 1873 – 30 July 1930), was a Princess of Siam (later Thailand), the daughter of Chulalongkorn, King Rama V of Siam.

Her mother was Chao Chom Manda Pae Bunnag (later elevated to Lady (Chao Khun Phra) Prayuravongse), daughter of Lord (Chao Phraya) Suravongs Vaiyavadhana (son of Somdet Chao Phraya Borom Maha Si Suriyawongse). She had one elder sister and one younger sister:
 Princess Srivalailaksana, the Princess of Suphanburi (24 July 1868 – 26 October 1904)
 Princess Bandhavanna Varobhas (25 May 1875 – 15 May 1891)

Vilayabanna died on 30 July 1930, at the age of 57.

Royal Decorations
  Dame Cross of the Most Illustrious Order of Chula Chom Klao (First class): received 25 November 1900

Ancestry

1873 births
1930 deaths
19th-century Thai women
19th-century Chakri dynasty
20th-century Thai women
20th-century Chakri dynasty
Thai female Phra Ong Chao
Dames Grand Cross of the Order of Chula Chom Klao
Children of Chulalongkorn
Daughters of kings